Precept is an unincorporated community in Furnas County, Nebraska, United States.

History
A post office was established in Precept in 1877, and remained in operation until it was discontinued in 1906.

References

Populated places in Furnas County, Nebraska
Unincorporated communities in Nebraska